Khaled Soliman (born 2 December 1954) is an Egyptian former fencer. He competed in the foil and épée events at the 1984 Summer Olympics.

References

External links
 

1954 births
Living people
Egyptian male épée fencers
Olympic fencers of Egypt
Fencers at the 1984 Summer Olympics
Egyptian male foil fencers
20th-century Egyptian people
21st-century Egyptian people